The 2008 WNBA Finals was the championship series of the 2008 WNBA season, and the conclusion of the season's playoffs. The  Detroit Shock, top-seeded champions of the Eastern Conference, defeated the San Antonio Silver Stars, top-seeded champions of the Western Conference, three games to none in a best-of-five series. This was Detroit's third title in six years.

2008 marked the first time since switching to a five-game format that the Finals series was swept. The Shock made their fourth appearance in the Finals in six years. The Silver Stars appeared in the Finals for the first time in franchise history.

Going into the series, the Shock had won two championships, tied with the Los Angeles Sparks for second most in WNBA history. The now defunct Houston Comets hold the record with four championships won.

The Silver Stars' 24–10 record gave them home court advantage over Detroit (22–12). It did not matter, however, as the Shock swept the series, winning the first two games on the Silver Stars' home floor.

Road to the finals

Regular season series
The San Antonio Silver Stars won both games in the regular season series:

Game summaries
All times listed below are Eastern Daylight Time.

Game 1

The Silver Stars' defense was able to hold Deanna Nolan to just 10 points in forty minutes of play. But they had no answer for Katie Smith (25 points, 4–8 3P-FG) or Taj McWilliams-Franklin (24 points, 65% FG).

The Silver Stars, who lost to an Eastern Conference team for the first time all season after 14 wins, were led by Sophia Young's 21 points and 16 from Ann Wauters.

Detroit didn't get its first lead until 2:19 into the second quarter when Smith made two free throws to go up 21–20 before the Shock outscored San Antonio 21-12 the rest of the half for the double-digit margin.

The Silver Stars went cold, shooting 4-of-16 in the second quarter. San Antonio played without key reserves Helen Darling and Edwige Lawson-Wade. Darling strained her right calf and Lawson-Wade sprained her right ankle during Saturday's Game 2 victory over Los Angeles in the Western Conference semifinals.

Detroit, already without All-Star forward Cheryl Ford, missed Plenette Pierson for the third time in the last five games because of a labrum tear in her right shoulder.

Game 2

Katie Smith scored 22 points and the Shock built a big lead in the first quarter, then hung on to beat the San Antonio Silver Stars 69–61 and go up 2–0. Deanna Nolan and Kara Braxton added 12 points each for the Shock, who led 19–2 less than 6 minutes into the game.

Detroit made nine of its first 10 shots and San Antonio missed its first seven attempts, allowing the Shock to build a 10–0 lead. The Silver Stars didn't score from the floor until 5:57 into the game, when Hammon converted on a drive to the basket that made it 19–4.

The Silver Stars tied the game with 3:26 left in the third quarter on a pair of free throws by Hammon, and she put San Antonio ahead 45–44 with 1:46 left in the quarter on another pair of free throws. Plenette Pierson, wearing a protective wrap on her shoulder after missing Game 1 with an injury, answered with a reverse layup for her only points of the night. Smith followed with two free throws that gave Detroit a 48–45 lead heading into the fourth quarter. The Shock expanded the lead to 66–55 with 2:15 to play after Smith hit a 10-foot jumper, Taj McWilliams-Franklin scored on a 17-footer and Braxton made a layup.

Game 3

Detroit became the second team in league history to win a third championship. Only the Houston Comets, who won the first four (1997–2000), have more. Los Angeles (2001, 2002) is the only other team with more than one. It was a redeeming win for the Shock, who let the 2007 title slip away, losing Game 5 at The Palace of Auburn Hills to the Phoenix Mercury.

Detroit swept the league's best regular-season team, winning the clincher at the Eastern Michigan University Convocation Center, a venue forced upon them because of a scheduling conflict. The Shock won their 2003 championship at The Palace and their '06 title at Detroit's Joe Louis Arena, also a substitute venue because of a logistical conflict.

The game was tight for three quarters with San Antonio leading by six on several occasions. But the veteran Shock were too much to take in the fourth with the title on the line. The Shock had been one of the league's best teams for much of the year, but sputtered a bit after losing top post player Cheryl Ford to a season-ending knee injury in July.

But a trade for the veteran McWilliams-Franklin over the Olympic break was just what Detroit needed. It won its last five games of the regular season and six of seven after the monthlong Olympic break and carried the momentum into the playoffs.

The Shock are now considered the second dynasty of the WNBA.

Awards
2008 WNBA Champion: Detroit Shock
Finals MVP: Katie Smith

Rosters

{| class="toccolours" style="font-size: 95%; width: 100%;"
|-
! colspan="2" style="background-color: #00008B; color: #D3D3D3; text-align: center;" | 2008 Detroit Shock Finals roster
|- style="background-color: #DC143C;color: #FFFFFF; text-align: center;"
! Players !! Coaches
|-
| valign="top" |
{| class="sortable" style="background:transparent; margin:0px; width:100%;"
! Pos. !! # !! Nat. !! Name !! Height !! Weight !!class="unsortable"| !! From
|-

{| class="toccolours" style="font-size: 95%; width: 100%;"
|-
! colspan="2" style="background-color: #000000; color: #D3D3D3; text-align: center;" | 2008 San Antonio Silver Stars Finals roster
|- style="background-color: #D3D3D3;color: #000000; text-align: center;"
! Players !! Coaches
|-
| valign="top" |
{| class="sortable" style="background:transparent; margin:0px; width:100%;"
! Pos. !! # !! Nat. !! Name !! Height !! Weight !!class="unsortable"| !! From
|-

References

Finals
Detroit Shock
San Antonio Stars
2008 in sports in Texas
2008 in sports in Michigan
Women's National Basketball Association Finals
21st century in San Antonio
Basketball competitions in San Antonio
Basketball competitions in Michigan
Sports in Ypsilanti, Michigan